Richard Bevan Braithwaite  (15 January 1900 – 21 April 1990) was an English philosopher who specialized in the philosophy of science, ethics, and the philosophy of religion.

Life
Braithwaite was born in Banbury, Oxfordshire, son of the historian of early Quaker history, William Charles Braithwaite. He was educated at Sidcot School, Somerset (1911–14), and Bootham School, York, 1914–18. As a conscientious objector in the First World War, he served in the Friends' Ambulance Unit.

He entered King's College, Cambridge, in 1919 to study physics and mathematics, became an Apostle, and gained a BA in 1923 and MA in 1926. He was a Fellow of King's College, Cambridge from 1924 to 1990. He was appointed Cambridge University Lecturer in Moral Sciences in 1928.

He was a lecturer in moral science at the University of Cambridge from 1934 to 1953, then Knightbridge Professor of Moral Philosophy there from 1953 to 1967. He was president of the Aristotelian Society from 1946 to 1947, and was elected a Fellow of the British Academy in 1957.

He was married (secondly) to the computational linguist and philosopher Margaret Masterman, with whom he founded the Epiphany Philosophers a group of (largely) Anglicans and Quakers seeking a new view of the relationship between philosophy and science.

Work
Although he was positivistically inclined, Braithwaite was a Christian, having been brought up a Quaker and becoming an Anglican later. According to theologian Alister McGrath, Braithwaite's 1955 Eddington Memorial Lecture "An Empiricist's View of the Nature of Religious Belief" is to date the most widely cited publication (e.g. by Anglican priest Don Cupitt) from a genre of 1970s–1980s theological works arguing that "God" and "religion" are human constructs—having no independent reality of their own—and that human dignity and freedom may best be advanced by systematic deconstruction of these two ideas, although Braithwaite himself had little sympathy for vague claims like these.

His major work was his book Scientific Explanation: A Study of the Function of Theory, Probability and Law in Science (1953) but, like his Eddington Lecture it was his inaugural lecture ("Theory of Games as a Tool for the Moral Philosopher") that was his more original contribution: although a logician and philosopher of science, he had been elected to a chair of moral philosophy (ethics) about which he considered he knew little. His inaugural lecture attempted to bring what he did know about the theory of games into some relation with ethical reasoning and, in doing that, he effectively started a whole new field of study, namely, how game-theoretic considerations are related to ethical ones. After his retirement in 1967 Braithwaite was a visiting professor at Johns Hopkins University where he lectured on game theory and encouraged one of his students, Alexander Rosenberg, to apply the approach of Scientific Explanation to economics.

It was Braithwaite's poker that Ludwig Wittgenstein reportedly brandished at Karl Popper during their confrontation at a Moral Sciences Club meeting in Braithwaite's rooms in King's. The implement subsequently disappeared. Braithwaite was a friend of Frank P. Ramsey (about whom he was interviewed by D.H. Mellor on BBC Radio in 1978) and, after Ramsey's early death, edited a collection of his papers.

A Festschrift, Science, Belief and Behaviour: Essays in Honour of R. B. Braithwaite, edited by D. H. Mellor, was published in 1980. It included essay contributions from Mellor himself and Ian Hacking amongst others.

Select publications
 Moral principles and inductive policies (1952) [from Proceedings of the British Academy 36 (1950): 51–68.]
 Scientific Explanation: A Study of the Function of Theory, Probability and Law in Science (1953)
 Theory of Games as a Tool for the Moral Philosopher (1955)
 An Empiricist's View of the Nature of Religious Belief (1955)

For a more complete list of works see "Bibliography of the philosophical writings of R. B. Braithwaite" or his entry at PhilPapers.

References

Further reading
M. Hesse, 'Richard Bevan Braithwaite, 1900–1990', Proceedings of the British Academy, 82 (1993), 367–80.
Mellor, D. H. (1990). "R. B. Braithwaite (1900–1990)". The British Journal for the Philosophy of Science, 41(4), 579–580.

External links 
Richard Bevan Braithwaite – 1930s photographic portrait by Ramsey & Muspratt at the National Portrait Gallery, London

1900 births
1990 deaths
Alumni of King's College, Cambridge
Analytic philosophers
Anglican philosophers
Aristotelian philosophers
British conscientious objectors
British ethicists
Cambridge University Moral Sciences Club
Converts to Anglicanism from Quakerism
20th-century English philosophers
Fellows of King's College, Cambridge
Fellows of the British Academy
Former Quakers
People associated with the Friends' Ambulance Unit
People educated at Bootham School
People from Banbury
Philosophers of education
Philosophers of religion
Philosophers of science
Presidents of the Aristotelian Society
20th-century Quakers
Knightbridge Professors of Philosophy